The Grand Island East Channel Light is a lighthouse located just north of Munising, Michigan and was intended to lead boats from Lake Superior through the channel east of Grand Island into the Munising Harbor. Constructed of wood, the light first opened for service in 1868. The light was very hard to see from Lake Superior, and light maintenance was very difficult so the Munising Range Lights were constructed (Munising Rear Range Light, Munising Front Range Light) and this light was removed from service in 1908 or 1913 (sources vary).

The lighthouse was severely neglected, and was in danger of being washed away due to erosion. The Grand Island East Channel Lighthouse Rescue Committee was officially formed. Private fund raising was undertaken. Restoration efforts (albeit in "rustic form" not pristine as it was in service) were undertaken. The theory for the lack of paint is that it is more picturesque and attractive to tourists and passing photographers.

As two commentators, lamenting the possible loss of this unique light station, noted in Lighthouse Digest:
It is seen and photographed by thousands of tourists via the Picture Rocks Cruises and Grand Island Charters Glass Bottom Boat tours which make it their first stop on their numerous tours. It appears on sweatshirts, tee-shirts, coffee mugs, post cards, advertisements, and calendars. It is positively one of Michigan's most recognizable landmarks. . . .

In 2000, 85 volunteers worked steadily for thirty days, and completed 75% of a  seawall to protect the light.
In 2000, the light has been restored and the wall completed.

It is part of a listing on the National Register of Historic Places, Reference #80004835. Name of Listing: HISTORIC ENGINEERING & INDUSTRIAL SITES IN MICHIGAN TR. It is not listed on the state registry.

Access
The most common way to see the light is to take either of the cruises out of Munising (Shipwreck Tour or Pictured Rocks tour), or Grand Island Cruises, all of which pass by this light and pause for photographers. Alternatively, sea kayak tours of Grand Island are a good way to see this light. Daily trips are available from Memorial Day weekend through October 10. Sea Kayaking is a popular method of exploring the island and is the best way to see it, although it is a serious trip in dangerous and cold water, which should not be undertaken lightly or without proper equipment (dress for the water temperature, not the air temperature). Guides are available. The most efficient port of entry for a sea kayak is from the harbor at Munising.

Out of Munising, Shipwreck Tours and Pictured Rocks Cruises offer boat tours that pass closely by this lighthouse. The ferry to tour Grand Island is available, but does not pass by either Grand Island lighthouses. They are located on private property and are not accessible.

The lighthouse is owned privately, and the grounds, dwelling and tower are closed.

See also
 Lighthouses in the United States

References

Further reading
Most Endangered Lighthouse: Grand Island, East Channel Lighthouse, (November, 1999)  Lighthouse Digest.
Harrison, Timothy and Case, Chris, Last Chance for Grand Island East Channel Light (January, 2000)  Lighthouse Digest.
New Products Help Grand Island East Channel Light Will you help save this lighthouse? (June, 2000). Lighthouse Digest.
Grand Island East Channel Light—Closer to Rescue April, 2001.  Lighthouse Digest.
LaFave, Michael (Mackinac Center), "Privatization Shines" - article on the general subject of privatization of lighthouses.

Wobser, David, Great Laker Magazine, Grand Island East Channel Range Light, Boatnerd.

External links
 
 Aerial photo at Marinas.com.
 Interactive map on Michigan lighthouses. Detroit News.
 Interactive map of lighthouses in eastern Lake Superior.

Satellite view at Google Maps.
 

Lighthouses completed in 1868
Houses completed in 1868
Lighthouses on the National Register of Historic Places in Michigan
1908 disestablishments in Michigan
Lighthouses in Alger County, Michigan
1868 establishments in Michigan
National Register of Historic Places in Alger County, Michigan